List of presidents of the National People's Assembly of Guinea-Bissau.

This is a list of presidents (speakers) of the National People's Assembly of Guinea-Bissau:

Sources

Politics of Guinea-Bissau
Guinea-Bissau, National People's Assembly